Owen Williams (19 July 1764 – 23 February 1832) was a member of parliament for Great Marlow from 25 May 1796 to his death 23 February 1832.

He was the son of another MP, Thomas Williams of Llanidan (died 29 November 1802), sometimes known as the "Copper King", alongside whom he served from 1796 to 1802.  His son Thomas Peers Williams was another MP for Great Marlow, and so was his grandson Lt-General Owen Lewis Cope Peers Williams (died 1904). 	

Williams was married to Margaret Hughes, possibly daughter of his father's partner Rev. Edward Hughes, of Llysdulas (or his brother Michael Hughes), and had issue, at least one son, Thomas. His English residence was Temple House at Bisham in Berkshire, very close to Marlow.

References

External links 

1764 births
1832 deaths
Members of the Parliament of Great Britain for English constituencies
Members of the Parliament of the United Kingdom for English constituencies
British MPs 1796–1800
UK MPs 1801–1802
UK MPs 1802–1806
UK MPs 1806–1807
UK MPs 1807–1812
UK MPs 1812–1818
UK MPs 1818–1820
UK MPs 1820–1826
UK MPs 1826–1830
UK MPs 1830–1831
UK MPs 1831–1832
People from Bisham